The 2012 Città di Caltanissetta was a professional tennis tournament played on clay courts. It was the 14th edition of the tournament which was part of the 2012 ATP Challenger Tour. It took place in Caltanissetta, Italy between 4 and 10 June 2012.

Singles main draw entrants

Seeds

 1 Rankings are as of May 28, 2012.

Other entrants
The following players received wildcards into the singles main draw:
  Marco Cecchinato
  Alejandro Falla
  Gianluca Naso
  Tommy Robredo

The following players received entry from the qualifying draw:
  Alejandro González
  Daniel Kosakowski
  Dominik Meffert
  Boris Pašanski

Champions

Singles

 Tommy Robredo def.  Gastão Elias, 6–3, 6–2

Doubles

  Marcel Felder /  Antonio Veić def.  Daniel Gimeno Traver /  Iván Navarro, 5–7, 7–6(7–5), [10–6]

External links
Official Website

Citta di Caltanissetta
Città di Caltanissetta